Paul Portner (born 1966) is an American linguist and Professor of Linguistics at Georgetown University. He is known for his works on linguistic modality.

Books
 Modality, Oxford University Press (Studies in Semantics and Pragmatics)
 What is Meaning?, Blackwell
 Mood,  Oxford University Press.

References

External links
Paul Portner

Living people
Georgetown University faculty
Linguists from the United States
Semanticists
Syntacticians
1966 births